Turkey offers warm and transparent waves of the Mediterranean on the south as well as wind swells of the Black Sea on the north. The wave period is shorter than the ocean waves but can reach up to periods of 11-12 second swells although the average swell period is 6–7 seconds.

Southern Turkey, the Mediterranean side, is a better surf destination for winter months with its warm blue waters, versatile waves, historic seaside towns, and traditional Turkish cuisine with inexpensive accommodation. Winter season is the high season for waves and the low season for tourist activity lowering the accommodation prices.

Alanya a tourist town located in southern Turkey produces surprisingly high-quality waves for the Mediterranean consistently reaching 20 surfable days a month in the winter/spring time (December, January, February, March, and April). During these months climate in this town averages 65 F with water temperatures averaging 65 F to 70 F. Ideal swells for this region accumulates from south, southeast, or east-south-east directions with southeast swells producing longer period, higher quality waves.

In Alanya; Damlatas beach offers hollow tubing waves where Keykubat beach offers longer mellower waves suitable both for long and short-board surfing. These waves are suitable for both beginners and experts alike. It is possible to find waves in this part of Mediterranean ranging anywhere from two to 12 feet. North of Turkey; Black Sea also offers rideable waves of different range from one to 12 feet. Nowadays, you can find a handful of local surfers surfing in the region on a regular basis.

History

With the great efforts of Tunc Ucyildiz and Turkish American Sports Club; formal modern surfing history in [Turkey] started with the 1st National Surfing Championship held in Istanbul. Tunc Ucyildiz not only won the first national title but also brought the first organized surfing event to Turkey. In 2013, he represented Turkey for the first time in ISA World Surfing Games where national athletes compete. The culture of surfing in Turkey dates back to the Ottoman Empire time where the locals used to body surf in the Black Sea region. This particular body surf activity is called "viya". This tradition is still in place and many locals are performing "viya" in Black Sea and Mediterranean region to this day.

References

External links
Sabah Gazetesi, November 2012
National Press Posta News
Posta Gazetesi, October 2012
Sports Ministry Official Article: ministry press, November 2012
Official video of International Surfing Association: ISA, May 2013
Transworld Surf Magazine: surf magazine, September 2012.

Turkey
Turkish surfers
Water sports in Turkey